Diclybothriidea is an order of monogeneans in the subclass Polyopisthocotylea.

Families
Diclybothriidae Bychowsky & Gusev, 1950
Hexabothriidae Price, 1942

References

Polyopisthocotylea
Platyhelminthes orders